Minixi is a small neotropical genus of potter wasps currently containing  4 species. One species (Minixi mexicanum) is restricted  to Southern United States, Mexico and Central America. The other three species are rather common and widespread through eastern South America.

References

 Giordani Soika, A. 1978. Revisione degli Eumenidi neotropicali appartenenti ai generi Eumenes Latr., Omicron (Sauss.), Pararaphidoglossa  Schulth. ed affini. Boll. Mus. Civ. Stor. Nat. Venezia 29: 1–420.

Potter wasps
Hymenoptera genera